Bethesda originally referred to the Pool of Bethesda, a pool in Jerusalem, described in the New Testament story of the healing the paralytic at Bethesda.

Bethesda may also refer to:

Places

Antigua and Barbuda
Bethesda, Antigua and Barbuda

Canada
Bethesda, Simcoe County, Ontario, Canada
Bethesda, York Regional Municipality, Ontario, Canada

South Africa
Nieu-Bethesda, South Africa

Suriname
Bethesda, Suriname, a former leper colony

United Kingdom
Bethesda, Gwynedd, Wales
Bethesda Athletic F.C.
Bethesda RFC, a rugby union team
Bethesda, Pembrokeshire, Wales

United States
Bethesda, Arkansas
Bethesda, Chatham County, Georgia
Bethesda, Greene County, Georgia
Bethesda, Davidson County, North Carolina
Bethesda, Durham County, North Carolina
Bethesda, Iowa
Bethesda, Maryland
Bethesda station, a Washington Metro station in Bethesda, Maryland
Bethesda Naval Hospital (now Walter Reed National Military Medical Center)
Bethesda (Ellicott City, Maryland), a  plantation house
Bethesda, Ohio
Bethesda, Pennsylvania
Bethesda, Tennessee
Bethesda, West Virginia
Bethesda, Wisconsin
Bethesda Terrace and Fountain, in New York City's Central Park
Bethesda Academy, Savannah, Georgia

Other uses
Bethesda system, a classification system for cervical neoplasia, named after the town in Maryland
Bethesda Softworks, a video games publishing company, named after the town in Maryland
Bethesda Game Studios, Bethesda Softworks' in-house video game development company

See also

Bethesda Chapel (disambiguation)
Bethesda Church (disambiguation)
Bethesda Hospital (disambiguation)
Bethsaida (disambiguation)